Jason Patric (born June 17, 1966) is an American film, television and stage actor. He is known for his roles in films such as The Lost Boys, Rush,  Sleepers, Geronimo: An American Legend, Your Friends & Neighbors, Narc, The Losers, The Alamo, and Speed 2: Cruise Control. His father was actor/playwright Jason Miller and his maternal grandfather was actor Jackie Gleason.

Early life
Born in New York City in the borough of Queens, Patric is the son of Academy Award-nominated actor and Pulitzer Prize-winning playwright Jason Miller (born John Anthony Miller Jr.) and actress Linda Miller (born Linda Mae Gleason), and his maternal grandfather was actor/comedian Jackie Gleason. His half-brother is actor Joshua John Miller. His ancestry is mostly Irish, with some German.

Growing up in Upper Saddle River, New Jersey, he attended schools such as Cavallini Middle School and the all-boys Catholic school Salesian Roman Catholic Don Bosco Preparatory High School (Ramsey, New Jersey). In California, he attended Saint Monica Catholic High School (Santa Monica, California). He appeared in high school productions of Dracula and Grease.

Career
After graduation, he was cast in the television drama Toughlove with Bruce Dern. The following year, Patric was cast in Solarbabies alongside Peter DeLuise, Jami Gertz, Lukas Haas, James LeGros and Adrian Pasdar. Within a couple years, Patric would reunite with Gertz in The Lost Boys and After Dark, My Sweet with Dern. He co-starred with George Dzundza and Stephen Baldwin in The Beast.

In 1993, he starred alongside Gene Hackman and Robert Duvall as 1st Lt. Charles B. Gatewood in the movie Geronimo: An American Legend. His scenes in The Thin Red Line were cut before the film's release. He turned down the lead role in The Firm (1993), which went to Tom Cruise. He garnered excellent reviews for his performances as undercover narcotics officers in Rush (1991) and Narc (2002).

In 2005, Patric appeared on Broadway as "Brick" in a revival of Tennessee Williams' Cat on a Hot Tin Roof, opposite Ashley Judd, Ned Beatty and esteemed character actress Margo Martindale. He next appeared on Broadway opposite Brian Cox, Chris Noth, Kiefer Sutherland and Jim Gaffigan in a revival of his father Jason Miller's play, That Championship Season, which began previews on February 9, 2011, and closed on May 29, 2011. The play (written by Jason Miller) debuted in 1972, and won, among other awards, the Pulitzer Prize and the Tony Award.

In 2012, he began filming the Civil War film, Copperhead, but several weeks into the shoot, he was removed from the project by the director, Ronald F. Maxwell for "failing to take direction". His replacement was Billy Campbell.

Personal life
Patric began dating actress Julia Roberts days after she canceled her wedding to Kiefer Sutherland in June 1991.

He then dated Danielle Schreiber off-and-on for approximately ten years. During the relationship they conceived a son through in vitro fertilization. However they separated in May 2012. Schreiber's attorneys argued that, under California law, Patric was merely a sperm donor, as Schreiber and Patric had not married and the conception of the child was by artificial means, and therefore Patric had no custody rights. Patric pursued changes to the law that bars such parental rights. He then sued for parental rights to the child, but lost the case at the trial court level.

The Court of Appeal of California, however, ruled that the California Family Code did not preclude Patric from establishing that he was presumed a parent based on his post-birth conduct. The case was sent back to the trial court, and in late 2014 he was legally recognized as the father of his son, with the court granting him parental rights. Following his loss in trial court, he lobbied the California legislature to give parental rights to sperm donors.

Filmography

Film

Television

Awards and nominations
Las Vegas Film Critics Society Awards
1998: Won, "Best Supporting Actor" - Your Friends & Neighbors

Online Film Critics Society Awards
1999: Nominated, "Best Supporting Actor" - Your Friends & Neighbors

Prism Awards
2003: Nominated, "Best Performance in a Theatrical Feature Film" - Narc

Golden Raspberry Award
1998: Nominated, "Worst Screen Couple" - Speed 2: Cruise Control (shared w/Sandra Bullock)

Satellite Award
1999: Nominated, "Best Performance by an Actor in a Supporting Role in a Dramatic Motion Picture" - Your Friends & Neighbors

Stockholm International Film Festival
2007: Won, "Best Actor" - Expired

Western Heritage Awards
1994: Won, "Best Theatrical Motion Picture" - Geronimo: An American Legend

References

External links

1966 births
Male actors from New Jersey
Male actors from New York City
American male film actors
American male stage actors
American people of German descent
American people of Irish descent
Don Bosco Preparatory High School alumni
People from Queens, New York
People from Upper Saddle River, New Jersey
20th-century American male actors
21st-century American male actors
Living people